is the sixteenth single of J-pop idol group Morning Musume and was released October 30, 2002 under Zetima Records with the catalog number EPCE-5182.

Track listing 
  – 4:28
  – 4:40
 "Koko ni Iruzee!" (Instrumental) – 4:26

Personnel
 1st generation: Kaori Iida, Natsumi Abe
 2nd generation: Kei Yasuda, Mari Yaguchi
 4th generation: Rika Ishikawa, Hitomi Yoshizawa, Nozomi Tsuji, Ai Kago
 5th generation: Ai Takahashi, Asami Konno, Makoto Ogawa, Risa Niigaki

Musicians 
Aside from Morning Musume, the following personnel also took part in track 1 ("Koko ni Iruzee!") as background vocals.
 Morning Musume – lead vocals, background vocals (track 1), and chorus (track 2)
 Tsunku – composer, and chorus (track 1)
 Hideyuki "Daichi" Suzuku – programming, and guitar (track 1)
 Kōichi Takahashi – programming, and guitar (track 2)
 Masayuki Muraishi – drums (track 1)
 Takeshi Taneda – bass (track 1 and 2)
 Gen Ittetsu Strings – strings (track 1)
 Naoki Hirata (The Thrill) – trumpet (track 1)
 Akihito Masui – trombone (track 1)
 Yukarie (The Thrill) – saxophone (track 1)

Charts

Cover versions

Tsunku version 
Two years after the release of the single, Morning Musume producer Tsunku covered the song along with "Mr. Moonlight: Ai no Big Band" (another Morning Musume song) and is featured in his album Take 1.

Nozomi Tsuji version 

Former Morning Musume member Nozomi Tsuji released her own rendition of the song on May 16, 2007 as the opening theme of the anime Robby and Kerobby and as her debut single under the same label of the original version. Though the main track is "Koko ni Iruzee!", the coupling track is different and is named "Happy My Friend."

Track listing 
 
 "Happy My Friend"
 Lyrics and composition by Tsunku; Arrangement by Akira.
 "Koko ni Iruzee! (Instrumental)"

References

External links 
 Hello! Project official website: Koko ni Iruzee! (Morning Musume version), Koko ni Iruzee! (Nozomi Tsuji version) 

Morning Musume songs
Zetima Records singles
2002 singles
Oricon Weekly number-one singles
Songs written by Tsunku
Song recordings produced by Tsunku
Japanese-language songs
2002 songs